The 2019 season is Seinäjoen Jalkapallokerho's 12th competitive season, and sixth in the Veikkausliiga.

Season Events
On 16 August, Aleksei Yeryomenko left his role as manager by mutual consent, with Brian Page being appointed in his place.

Squad

Transfers

In

Loans in

Released

Friendlies

Competitions

Veikkausliiga

The 2019 Veikkausliiga season begins on 3 April 2019 and ends on 3 November 2019.

Regular season

Results summary

Results by matchday

Results

Finnish Cup

Sixth Round

Squad statistics

Appearances and goals

|-
|colspan="14"|U23 Players:

|-
|colspan="14"|Players away from the club on loan:
|-
|colspan="14"|Players who left SJK during the season:

|}

Goal scorers

Clean sheets

Disciplinary record

Notes

References

2019
SJK